Iurubanga arixi is a species of beetle in the family Cerambycidae, and the only species in the genus Iurubanga. It was described by Martins and Galileo in 1996.

References

Desmiphorini
Beetles described in 1996
Monotypic beetle genera